MA-1 may refer to:

 Bennett MA-1 ventilator, a powerful medical ventilator to assist respiration
 Fire control system used on the F-106 interceptor
 MA-1 bomber jacket, a nylon flight jacket
 MA-1 rifle, a variant of the EMERK K-3 rifle
 U.S. Route 1 in Massachusetts
 The abbreviation for Massachusetts's 1st congressional district
 Mercury-Atlas 1, a test flight of Project Mercury
 Mal'ta boy, Paleolithic human remains